CABS may refer to
Campus Area Bus Service, a bus system at Ohio State University
Centre for Airborne Systems
Current Awareness in Biological Sciences
Committee Against Bird Slaughter